Archibald Maynard Atkinson (February 17, 1886 – August 4, 1968) was a Canadian professional ice hockey player. He played with the Montreal Wanderers of the National Hockey Association in the 1912–13 season and 1913–14 season, appearing in a total of seven games.

References

External links
Archie Atkinson at JustSportsStats

1880s births
1968 deaths
Canadian ice hockey defencemen
Ice hockey people from Ottawa
Montreal Wanderers (NHA) players